Selimkhan Abubakarov (born ) is a Kazakhstani male weightlifter, competing in the +105 kg category and representing Kazakhstan at international competitions. He competed at both World Youth championships and World championships, most recently at the 2014 World Weightlifting Championships.

Major results

References

Further reading 
 Olympic.org Profile
 The Sports.org Profile
 OlyStats.com statistics
 Confederation.kz
 Dallas Strength and Conditioning
 2013 Men over 105kg world standings
 2014 Men over 105kg world standings

Living people
1997 births
Kazakhstani male weightlifters
Place of birth missing (living people)